The Metropolitan Open is a golf tournament organized by the Metropolitan Golf Association. In the early 20th century it was one of the top events in the country and was retroactively given PGA Tour-level status.

History 
The tournament has been played annually since 1905. It is the third oldest "open" golf tournament in the United States, after the U.S. Open and Western Open. It was staged for the first time in 1905 at Fox Hills Golf Club on Staten Island, which played the dual role of host and sponsor. In 1908, the Metropolitan Golf Association hosted the tournament for the first time. In 1914, Macdonald Smith shot recorded a 278 aggregate, the lowest score ever for a 72 hole tournament. 

In the 1920s, according to the Brooklyn Daily Eagle, the event was "weakening" due to alleged neglect from the Metropolitan Golf Association (MGA). In addition, the event was often held in the middle of the summer in the interior of New Jersey or New York. The weather tended to be very hot which discouraged players from attending the tournament and sponsors for supporting the event. In addition, all three local sections in the tri-state regions "didn't want it." However, in 1932 the MGA began scheduling the event immediately before the U.S. Open which was normally held in nearby northeast states. Most of the top golfers therefore played The Met Open as a warm-up for the national championship and the event's "prestige" increased. Some newspapers referred to it as one of the top five events in the world at the time, along with the U.S. Open, British Open, Western Open, and PGA Championship. In 1936, "most of the nation's outstanding stars" played in the event, including Gene Sarazen, Craig Wood, Paul Runyan, and leading amateur Jess Sweetser. A young Byron Nelson won the event, one of his first big wins. In 1939, it was regarded as "richer in tradition than any tournament except the National Open" by The Daily Times. In 1940, there was one of the most notable performances. Craig Wood scored at 264 (−16) total and won the event by 11 strokes over Ben Hogan. In addition, according to The Associated Press his 264 total was considered the second lowest 72-hole total any tournament ever, only behind Percy Alliss' 262 total at the 1935 Italian Open. He also broke the tournament record by 14 strokes, which had stood for 26 years.

In 1941, however, the Metropolitan Golf Association "discontinued" the event citing that it was a "financial burden." At the end of the decade, however, the organization renewed the event and it has evolved one the premier local events in the tri-state area. In 1976, the Met Open became one of the first tournaments to use a 3-hole aggregate playoff, a style now adopted by most of the major championships. The 2009 winner was Andrew Giuliani, the son of former New York City mayor Rudy Giuliani.

Winners 

Sources:

1Picard and Runyan tied with a 70 at the end of the first 18-hole playoff while Ghezzi was eliminated with a 77. In the second playoff, Picard defeated Runyan 69 to 71.

References

External links
Metropolitan Golf Association

 

Former PGA Tour events
Golf in Connecticut
Sports competitions in Connecticut
Golf in New Jersey
Golf in New York (state)
Recurring sporting events established in 1905
1905 establishments in New York City